KFX may refer to:

Computing
 KFX (program), the kernel language of FX-87, a polymorphic typed functional language
 Kameleon FireEx KFX, a computational fluid dynamics simulation program focusing on gas dispersion and fire simulation.
 .kfx, a proprietary ebook format for the Amazon Kindle
 Kofax (stock ticker: KFX), process automation software provider

Other uses
 Kullui (ISO 639 language code: kfx)
 KAI KF-X, a South Korean project for development of an indigenous fighter aircraft
 KFX, a series of ATVs, see List of Kawasaki motorcycles
 OMX Copenhagen 20, a stock market index for the Copenhagen Stock Exchange, formerly known as KFX

See also

 KFXS radio station
 
 
 KF (disambiguation)